Tokur is an urban locality (a work settlement) in Selemdzhinsky District of Amur Oblast, Russia. Population:

Geography
The settlement is located in the area of the Selemdzha Range.

References

Notes

Sources

Urban-type settlements in Amur Oblast